"Ridin' My Thumb to Mexico" is a song written and recorded by American country music artist Johnny Rodriguez.  It was released in August 1973 as the first single from the album All I Ever Meant to Do Is Sing.  The song was Rodriguez's second number one on the U.S. country singles chart.  The single stayed at number one for two weeks and spent a total of thirteen weeks on the charts.

Chart performance

References
 

1973 singles
Johnny Rodriguez songs
Song recordings produced by Jerry Kennedy
Mercury Records singles
1973 songs
Songs written by Johnny Rodriguez